Viktor Markelj (born 1958, Zgornja Bistrica) is a Slovenian structural engineer and bridge specialist.

Career

Markelj graduated from the University of Maribor - Faculty of Civil Engineering in 1982. He obtained a PhD degree in civil engineering at 	FGPA - Faculty of Civil Engineering, Transportation Engineering and Architecture in Maribor in 2016, under the joint supervision of Branko Bedenik and Zlatko Šavor. His doctoral dissertation focused on Innovations in incremental launching method of bridge construction.  

From 1981 he worked at Gradis Design Office where he participated in designing of several large bridges and viaducts constructed by Gradis. In 1990, he and Marjan Pipenbaher founded Ponting Bridges, a Slovenian studio for structural engineering, focusing mainly on bridge structures, with headquarters in Maribor. The practice is led by a duo of its founders, dr. Viktor Markelj and Marjan Pipenbaher, and has constructed many high-profile bridges.   

His high-profile bridges include Ada Bridge in Belgrade, Serbia (2012), drawbridge in Gdansk, Poland (2017) and Puch Bridge in Ptuj, Slovenia (2007). He lives in Slovenska Bistrica. 

He is a lecturer in bridges at the Faculty of Civil Engineering in Maribor since 2003.

Major projects
Major projects, by year of completion and ordered by type, are:

Bridges
 Bridge over Mura River, highway Vučja vas - Beltinci, Slovenia (2003)
 Puch Bridge, Ptuj, Slovenia (2007) 
 Viaduct Šumljak, highway Razdrto - Selo, Slovenia (2009)
 Viaduct Lešnica North / South, Slovenia (2007/2011)
 Ada Bridge, Belgrade, Serbia (2012)
 NAR Viaducts, Belgrade, Serbia (2018)

Over- and underpasses
 Arch overpass 4-3 in Kozina, Slovenia (1997)
 Underpass in Celje, Slovenia (2004)
 Overpass 4-6 in Slivnica, Slovenia (2008)
 Viaduct/overpass Grobelno, Slovenia (2015)

Pedestrian and cyclist bridges
 Footbridge over Soča, Bovec, Slovenia (2007)
 Studenci footbridge, Maribor, Slovenia (2007)
 Marinič footbridge, Škocjan Caves Park, Slovenia (2010)
 Ribja brv, Ljubljana, Slovenia (2014)
 Pedestrian and cyclist drawbridge to Ołowianka Island, Gdansk, Poland (2017)
 Langur Way Canopy Walk, Penang Hill, Malaysia (2018)
 Tremerje Footbridge, Laško, Slovenia (2019)

Tunnels and galleries
 Tunnel Malečnik, Maribor, Slovenia (2009)
 Arcade gallery Meljski hrib, Maribor, Slovenia (2012)

Current
 Ada Huja Bridge, Belgrade, Serbia (preliminary design)
 Railway viaduct Pesnica, Slovenia (under construction)
 Observation tower Kristal, Rogaška Slatina, Slovenia (under construction)

Selected works

Awards 
 2019 Honorary City Certificate of Slovenska Bistrica to Dr. Viktor Markelj and Marjan Pipenbaher
 2019 Polish Minister of Investment and Development Award  to Footbridge to Ołowianka Island in Gdansk
 2018 City of Gdansk Award to Footbridge to Ołowianka Island in Gdansk
 2015 SCE Award to Viaduct Grobelno
 2012 WEF Award to Ada Bridge Belgrade
 2012 CES AWARD to Ada Bridge Belgrade 
 2012 AAB Award  to Ada Bridge Belgrade 
 2011 Footbridge Award to Marinic Bridge
 2009 City seal of Maribor to Studenci Footbridge Maribor
 2009 Award CSS of CCIS to Studenci Footbridge Maribor
 2008 Footbridge Award to Studenci Footbridge Maribor
 2007 SCE Award to Puch Bridge over Drava in Ptuj
 2004 SCE Award to Bridge over Mura River
 2004 UM Award 2004: Golden recognition award to Mr. Marjan Pipenbaher and Mr. Viktor Markelj

References

External links 
 Ponting Bridges Website

1958 births
Living people
Structural engineers
Viaduct engineers
Bridge engineers